Hussein Maalim Mohamed is a Kenyan politician. He is a former Minister of State in the office of the president.

Career
Mohamed was born to an ethnic Somali family from the Abdulwak sub-clan of the Ogaden Darod. His older brother Mahamoud Mohamed was the Chief of General Staff of the Kenya Defence Forces, and was responsible for successfully suppressing the 1982 coup d'état attempt against then President of Kenya Daniel arap Moi.

In 1983, Hussein became the first Somali to be appointed to Kenya's cabinet, when he was named Minister of State in the office of the presidency.

See also
Mahamoud Mohamed
Aden Bare Duale
Ahmed Issack Hassan

References

Living people
Ethnic Somali people
Kenyan people of Somali descent
Government ministers of Kenya
Year of birth missing (living people)